This is a list of chairmen of The Kennel Club, starting from the club's founding in 1873. The Kennel Club dates from the first organised dog show in UK on the 28/29 June 1859, following this in 1870 it was decided that a governing body was required to govern such shows. Sewallis Shirley called together a meeting of the National Dog Club Committee on 4 April 1873, where the Kennel Club was founded. Shirley was named as the first Chairman, and would go on to become the President of the society in 1899.

Chairmen

References
Specific

General

External links

Kennel clubs
Kennel Club